Hasna Jasimuddin Moudud (born 1946) is a Bangladeshi writer, environmentalist and a retired politician who served as a Jatiya Sangsad member representing the Noakhali-5 constituency in the 3rd and 4th parliament during 1986–1990.

Family
Hasna was born to poet Jasimuddin (1903–1976) and Begum Mamtaz Jasimuddin (d. 2006). Her siblings include  Jamal Anwar, Firoz Anwar, Khurshid Anwar and Asma Elahi. Hasna is married to Moudud Ahmed, a Bangladesh Nationalist Party politician and former Vice President and Prime Minister of Bangladesh. Hasna's eldest son, Asif Momtaz Moudud, died at the age of 3. Her second son, Aman Momtaj Moudud, died of dengue fever in 2015.

Education
Moudud completed her bachelor's from the University of Dhaka in 1965 and master's from the University of Dayton in 1969.

Career
Moudud was elected as the chairperson of 2015-2016 Bangladesh National Committee of International Union for Conservation of Nature members. She is currently a Mittal Institute Research Affiliate and a former Senior Fellow at the Harvard University Asia Center.

Moudud published a book, Mystic Poetry of Bangladesh, in 2017 and Where Women Rule: South Asia.

Awards
 Anannya Top Ten Award (2004)

References

Living people
1946 births
Bangladeshi women writers
Women members of the Jatiya Sangsad
University of Dhaka alumni
University of Dayton alumni
3rd Jatiya Sangsad members
4th Jatiya Sangsad members
Place of birth missing (living people)
Date of birth missing (living people)
People from Companiganj Upazila, Noakhali